Update is an album by jazz pianist Mal Waldron released on the Italian Soul Note label in 1987.  It features solo performances recorded in Milan, Italy.

Reception
The AllMusic review by Scott Yanow awarded the album 4½ stars, stating: "This solo set by pianist Mal Waldron serves as a perfect introduction to his unique style during the more recent part of his career... It is always very interesting to hear musicians who started out in straightforward hard bop stretching themselves and playing quite freely. This recording rewards repeated listenings."

Track listing
All compositions by Mal Waldron except as indicated
 "Free for C. T."  — 16:05 
 "A Night in Tunisia" (Dizzy Gillespie) — 6:09 
 "The Inchworm" (Frank Loesser) — 5:55 
 'Variations on a Theme by Cecil Taylor" — 14:48 
 "You're Getting to Be a Habit with Me" (Al Dubin, Harry Warren) — 5:16 
 "I Should Care" (Axel Stordahl, Paul Weston, Sammy Cahn) — 8:42 
Recorded at Barigozzi Studio in Milan, Italy, on March 10, 1986
recorded at MurecStudio ex Barigozzi Studio

Personnel
Mal Waldron – piano

References

1987 albums
Mal Waldron albums
Black Saint/Soul Note albums
Solo piano jazz albums